The Dance (Spanish: El baile) is a 1959 Spanish comedy-drama film written and directed by Edgar Neville. It is based on his own theatrical play, El baile, released in (1952), which won the Spanish Premio Nacional de Literatura award.

It was the second and last color film directed by Neville after Duende y misterio del flamenco.

Plot
Pedro (Alberto Closas) and  Julián (Rafael Alonso) are friends and they love the same woman, Adela (Conchita Montes). Madrid, 1905,  Pedro and Adela had gotten married but Julian live with them. 1930. Adela discovers she is going to die and the two men had hidden the illness. 1955. Adelita (Conchita Montes), Adela's grand daughter, visits to the two men and they remember their love to Adele.

Cast
Conchita Montes as Adela / Adelita
Alberto Closas as Pedro
Rafael Alonso as Julián

References

Bibliography
 Mira, Alberto. The A to Z of Spanish Cinema. Rowman & Littlefield, 2010.

External links
 

1959 films
1950s historical comedy-drama films
Spanish historical comedy-drama films
1950s Spanish-language films
Spain in fiction
Madrid in fiction
Films directed by Edgar Neville
1950s Spanish films